Neno Katulić (born 26 June 1975) is a retired Croatian football forward who last played in lower Croatian divisions. During his professional career he mainly played for Hrvatski Dragovoljac in Croatia’s Prva HNL, with a three-year stint in Austria.

References

1975 births
Living people
Footballers from Zagreb
Association football forwards
Croatian footballers
NK Hrvatski Dragovoljac players
NK Marsonia players
NK Inter Zaprešić players
HNK Rijeka players
NK Croatia Sesvete players
SC Weiz players
HNK Gorica players
Croatian Football League players
Croatian expatriate footballers
Expatriate footballers in Austria
Croatian expatriate sportspeople in Austria